Gazella harmonae is an extinct gazelle which existed in what is now Ethiopia during the Pliocene epoch. It was described by Denis Geraads, René Bobe and Kaye Reed in 2012. Approximately the size of a living dorcas gazelle, the animal was noted for its unusual, spiral horn cores.

References

Gazella
Pliocene even-toed ungulates
Prehistoric bovids
Pliocene mammals of Africa
Mammals described in 2012
Fossil taxa described in 2012